Eugenia rendlei is a species of plant in the family Myrtaceae. It is endemic to Jamaica.  It is threatened by habitat loss.

References

rendlei
Critically endangered plants
Endemic flora of Jamaica
Taxonomy articles created by Polbot